Dénes Gulyás (born 31 March 1954) is a Hungarian tenor. A native of  Budapest, he studied at the Franz Liszt Academy of Music in that city. He had an international career in the 1970s, and sang at the  Metropolitan Opera, among other houses; one of his performances there, a Manon in which he replaced Neil Shicoff as Des Grieux to the Manon of Catherine Malfitano, was broadcast live as part of the company's Saturday radio broadcast series.

He was also a member of Parliament, representing the Fidesz party, between 2006 and 2014.

Life
He completed locksmith trade school. At age 19, he was admitted to the Music Academy, where in 1978 he was awarded diplomas in Opera Singing and Artistic Instructor. In 1979, he won two prizes in the Giovanni Cantanti Lirici competition, as well as in 1982 winning 1st prize in the first national Luciano Pavarotti vocal competition. He was a soloist at the Budapest Opera House as well as the Szeged National Theater, led the Gyor Kisfaludi Theater Opera Association, and as Musical Advisor to the National Theater, he revived the Chamber Music Series at the refectory.

Since 1995, he has been teaching voice at the Liszt Ferenc Music Conservatory.

Political career
Until 2003, he had no party affiliation. However, at the (then) Fidesz Congressional Convention, he joined the party. In 2004, he was nominated for Presidency of the Pest Valley 10th district (Pilisvörösvár) where in 2006 he won by a substantial margin. Since 30 March 2006 he had been a member of Parliament's Cultural and Media committees.

Awards
 Franz Liszt Prize, 1982
 Artist of Merit of the Hungarian People's Republic, 1985
 Outstanding Artist of the Republic of Hungary, 2000
 Hungarian Heritage Award, 2014

Personal life
Gulyás is married and has three children.

References

External links

1954 births
Living people
Hungarian operatic tenors
Hungarian male film actors
Franz Liszt Academy of Music alumni
Fidesz politicians
Members of the National Assembly of Hungary (2006–2010)
Members of the National Assembly of Hungary (2010–2014)
Academic staff of the Franz Liszt Academy of Music
Recipients of the Order of Merit of the Republic of Hungary
Musicians from Budapest
Male actors from Budapest
Artists of Merit of the Hungarian People's Republic
Merited artists of the Republic of Hungary
20th-century Hungarian male opera singers
21st-century Hungarian male opera singers